Guerrillero is a Cuban newspaper. It is published in Spanish, with an online English edition. The newspaper is located in Pinar del Río.

External links 
 Guerrillero online 
 Guerrillero online 

Newspapers published in Cuba
Publications with year of establishment missing
Mass media in Pinar del Río